The fourth season of Golden Kamuy is a 2022 Japanese anime series, based on the manga series of the same title, written and illustrated by Satoru Noda. On December 5, 2021, it was announced that the series will receive a fourth season. Brain's Base is producing the season, replacing Geno Studio. Shizutaka Sugahara is serving as the chief director, and Takumi Yamakawa is designing the characters. Noboru Takagi is returning to write the scripts. The season premiered on October 3, 2022.



Episode list

Notes

References

2022 Japanese television seasons
2023 Japanese television seasons
Golden Kamuy episode lists